Joshua Odjick is a Canadian actor from Kitigan Zibi, Quebec. He is most noted for his performance as Pasmay in the 2021 film Wildhood, for which he won the Canadian Screen Award for Best Supporting Actor at the 10th Canadian Screen Awards in 2022, and the Vancouver Film Critics Circle award for Best Supporting Actor in a Canadian Film at the Vancouver Film Critics Circle Awards 2021.

A member of the Kitigan Zibi Anishinabeg First Nation, he attended Heritage College in Gatineau, Quebec.

In addition to Wildhood, he has appeared in the films Bootlegger and Bones of Crows, and the television series Coroner, Unsettled, Little Bird and The Swarm.

References

External links

21st-century Canadian male actors
Canadian male film actors
Canadian male television actors
First Nations male actors
Male actors from Quebec
Best Supporting Actor Genie and Canadian Screen Award winners
Living people
Year of birth missing (living people)
Algonquin people